Emmanuel Alejandro Tapia Estrada (born January 22, 1989) is a former Mexican footballer who played as forward.

Career
Emmanuel Tapia began in the Atlas youth academy. He spent time with many second and third division teams after his stint with Atlas.

In 2012, he arrived in with first division club Querétaro. He made his debut in a Copa MX match in which he scored a hat-trick against Veracruz. Tapia was later sent out on loan.

In the summer 2018, Tapia re-joined Suchitepéquez. On 20 March 2019 he announced on Facebook, that he had decided to leave the club due to personal reasons.

References

External links

1989 births
Living people
Footballers from Guadalajara, Jalisco
Mexican footballers
Association football forwards
C.D. Guastatoya players
C.D. Suchitepéquez players
Murciélagos FC footballers
Irapuato F.C. footballers
Querétaro F.C. footballers
Altamira F.C. players
Unión de Curtidores footballers